This is a list of political offices which have been held by a woman, with details of the first woman holder of each office. It is ordered by the countries in North and Central American and the Caribbean and by dates of appointment. Please observe that this list is meant to contain only the first woman to hold of a political office, and not all the female holders of that office.

Anguilla

 Minister of Social Services – Albena Lake-Hodge – 1976
 Governor – Christina Scott – 2013

Antigua and Barbuda

 Parliamentary Secretary of Women’s Affairs – Gwendolyn Tonge – 1994
 Member (Cabinet) - Gertel Thom - 2001
 Governor-General – Dame Louise Lake-Tack – 2007

Aruba

 Minister Plenipotentiary in The Hague – Ella Tromp-Yarzagaray – 1991
 Minister of Finance – Ella Tromp-Yarzagaray – 1993
 President of Parliament – Mervin Wyatt-Ras – 2005
 Prime Minister – Evelyn Wever-Croes – 2017

The Bahamas

 Minister of Transport – Doris Louise Johnson – 1969
 Foreign minister – Janet Bostwick – 1994
Attorney General and Minister of Legal Affairs - Janet Bostwick - 1995
 Governor-General – Dame Ivy Dumont – 2001
 Prime Minister (acting) – Cynthia Pratt – 2005

Barbados

 Minister of Parliament (House of Assembly) – Dame Edna ("Ermie") Bourne – 1951
 Health minister – Billie Miller – 1976
 Governor-General – Dame Nita Barrow – 1990 
 Foreign minister – Dame Billie Miller – 1994
 Attorney-General and Minister of Home Affairs – Mia Mottley – 2001
 Leader of the Opposition – Mia Mottley – 2008
President of the Senate – Sen. Kerry-Ann Ifill – First woman and blind person – 2012
 Prime Minister – Mia Mottley – 2018
 President – Sandra Mason – Inaugural President– 2021

Belize

 Minister of Education and Housing and Social Service – Gwendolyn Lizarraga – 1965
 Governor-General – Dame Minita Gordon – 1981
Ambassador of Belize to the U.S. - Lisa Shoman – 2000 
 Mayor of Belize City – Zenaida Moya – 2006
 Foreign minister – Lisa Shoman – 2007 
 President of Senate – Andrea Gill – 2008

Bermuda

 Minister of Health and Social Affairs – Gloria Juanita McPhee – 1968
 Premier – Pamela F. Gordon – 1997
 Governor – Rena Lalgie – 2020

British Virgin Islands

 Attorney General – Paula F. Beaubrun – 1971
House of Assembly of the British Virgin Islands Members – Ethlyn Smith and Eileene L. Parsons – 1995
Speaker of the House of Assembly – V. Inez Archibald – 2003
Governor (acting) – Dancia Penn – 2006

Canada

 Monarch – Queen Victoria – 1867
 City councillor and first woman elected to any political office in Canada – Hannah Gale – 1917
 Member of a provincial legislature – Louise McKinney (Alberta) – 1917 (first female legislator in the British Empire)
 Member of Parliament – Agnes Macphail – 1921
 Senator – Cairine Wilson – 1930
 Mayor – Barbara Hanley, Webbwood, Ontario – 1936
 Leader of a political party at the provincial level – Thérèse Casgrain (Parti social démocratique du Québec) – 1951
 Cabinet minister – Ellen Fairclough – 1958
 Candidate for the leadership of a federal political party – Mary Walker-Sawka – 1967 
 Speaker of the Senate of Canada – Muriel McQueen Fergusson – 1972
 Leader of a political party which won an election – Hilda Watson – 1978
 Secretary of State for External Affairs – Flora MacDonald – 1979
 Speaker of the House – Jeanne Sauvé – 1980
 Leader of a political party with seats in a provincial legislature – Alexa McDonough (Nova Scotia New Democratic Party) – 1980
 Governor General – Jeanne Sauvé – 1984
 Leader of a political party at the federal level – Kathryn Cholette (Green) – 1988
 Leader of a political party with representation in the House of Commons – Audrey McLaughlin (NDP) – 1989
Minister of Justice and Attorney General of Canada - Kim Campbell - 1990-1993
 Premier of a province – Rita Johnston (BC) – 1991
 Premier of a territory – Nellie Cournoyea (NWT) – 1991
 Prime Minister – Kim Campbell – 1993
 Leader of the Government in the Senate – Joyce Fairbairn – 1993
 Premier of a province in a general election – Catherine Callbeck (PEI) – 1993
 Deputy Prime Minister of Canada – Sheila Copps – 1993
 Leader of the Opposition in the House of Commons – Deborah Grey – 2000
 Leader of the Opposition in the Senate – Céline Hervieux-Payette – 2007

Ontario

 Federal Member of Parliament – Agnes Macphail – 1921
 Member of Provincial Parliament – Agnes Macphail and Rae Luckock – 1943
 Deputy Premier – Bette Stephenson – 1985
 Mayor of Toronto – June Rowlands – 1991
 Leader of a political party – Lyn McLeod – 1992
 Leader of the Opposition – Lyn McLeod – 1992
 Premier – Kathleen Wynne – 2013

Manitoba

 Member of the Legislative Assembly – Edith Rogers – 1920
 Winnipeg City Councillor – Jessie Kirk – 1920
 Federal Member of Parliament – Margaret Konantz (Rogers' daughter) – 1963
 Speaker of the Legislative Assembly – Thelma Forbes – 1963
 Member of the Executive Council – Thelma Forbes – 1966
 First Nations band chief – Jean Folster (as Chief of Norway House Cree Nation) – 1971
 Deputy Premier – Muriel Smith – 1971
 Lieutenant Governor – Pearl McGonigal – 1981
 Leader of a political party – Sharon Carstairs – 1984
 Leader of the Opposition – Sharon Carstairs – 1988
 Mayor of Winnipeg – Susan Thompson – 1992

Saskatchewan

 Member of the Legislative Assembly – Sarah Ramsland – 1919
 Federal Member of Parliament – Dorise Nielsen – 1940
 Leader of a political party – Lynda Haverstock – 1989

New Brunswick

 Federal Member of Parliament – Margaret Rideout – 1964
 Member of the Legislative Assembly – Brenda Robertson – 1967
 Cabinet minister – Brenda Robertson – 1970
 Leader of a political party – Elizabeth Weir and Barbara Baird – 1989

Quebec

 Leader of a political party – Thérèse Casgrain – 1951
 Member of the National Assembly – Marie-Claire Kirkland – 1961
 Federal Member of Parliament – Monique Bégin, Albanie Morin and Jeanne Sauvé – 1972
 Leader of the Opposition – Monique Gagnon-Tremblay – 1998
 Speaker of the National Assembly – Louise Harel – 2002
 Mayor of Quebec City – Andrée Boucher – 2005
 Leader of a political party with representation in the legislature – Pauline Marois – 2007
 Premier – Pauline Marois – 2012
 Elected Mayor of Montreal – Valérie Plante – 2017

Alberta

 Member of the Legislative Assembly – Louise McKinney and Roberta MacAdams – 1917
 Federal Member of Parliament – Cora Taylor Casselman – 1941
 Mayor of Edmonton – Janice Rhea Reimer – 1989
 Leader of a political party – Pam Barrett – 1996
 Leader of the Opposition in the Legislative Assembly – Nancy MacBeth – 1998
 Premier of Alberta – Allison Redford – 2011

Nova Scotia

 Member of the Legislative Assembly – Gladys Porter – 1960
 Federal Member of Parliament – Coline Campbell – 1974
 Leader of a political party – Alexa McDonough – 1980

British Columbia

 Member of the Legislative Assembly – Mary Ellen Smith – 1918
 Cabinet minister – Mary Ellen Smith – 1921
 Speaker of the Legislative Assembly – Mary Ellen Smith – 1928
 Federal Member of Parliament – Pauline Jewett – 1963
 Leader of a political party – Rita Johnston – 1991
 Premier – Rita Johnston – 1991
 Leader of the Opposition – Joy MacPhail – 2001

Prince Edward Island

 Candidate for the Legislative Assembly – Hilda Ramsay – 1951
 Federal Member of Parliament – Margaret Mary Macdonald – 1961
 Member of the Legislative Assembly – Jean Canfield – 1970
 Cabinet minister – Jean Canfield – 1972
 Leader of a political party – Pat Mella – 1990
 Premier – Catherine Callbeck – 1993

Newfoundland and Labrador

 Member of the House of Assembly of Newfoundland (pre-Confederation) – Helena Squires – 1930
 Member of the House of Assembly (post-Confederation) – Hazel McIsaac – 1975
 Cabinet ministers – Lynn Verge and Hazel Newhook – 1979
 Federal Member of Parliament – Jean Payne and Bonnie Hickey – 1993
 Leader of a political party – Lynn Verge – 1995
 Premier – Kathy Dunderdale – 2010

Yukon

 Federal Member of Parliament – Martha Black – 1935
 Member of the Legislative Assembly – G. Jean Gordon – 1967
 Leader of a political party – Hilda Watson – 1978
 Premier – Pat Duncan – 2000

Northwest Territories

 Member of the Legislative Assembly – Lena Pedersen (Pederson) – 1970
 Federal Member of Parliament – Ethel Blondin-Andrew – 1988
 Premier – Nellie Cournoyea – 1991

Nunavut

 Federal Member of Parliament – Nancy Karetak-Lindell – 1999
 Member of the Legislative Assembly – Manitok Thompson – 1999
 Premier – Eva Aariak – 2008

Cayman Islands

 Speaker of the National Assembly - Sybil McLaughlin - 1991
 Minister of Education – Sybil McLaughlin – 1996
 Premier – Julianna O'Connor-Connolly – 2012
 Governor – Helen Kilpatrick – 2013

Costa Rica

 Minister of Education – Estela Hernández Quezada de Niño – 1958
Interior minister – Janina del Vecchio Ugalde – 2008
President – Laura Chinchilla – 2010
Minister of Justice - Cecilia Sánchez Romero - 2017

Cuba
 Minister without Portfolio – María Gómez Carbonell – 1942
 Minister of Education – Zolia Mulet y Proenza – 1954

Curaçao

 Commissioner of Health  – Maria Liberia-Peters – 1977
 Deputy Governor – Maria Liberia-Peters – 1982
Governor (acting) – Adèle van der Pluijm-Vrede – 2012
Governor – Lucille George-Wout – 2013

Dominica

 Minister of Labour and Social Affairs – Phyllis Shand Allfrey – 1958
 Minister of Communications & Works – Mabel Moir James – 1966
 Minister of Home Affairs – Mabel Moir James – 1970
 Prime Minister – Dame Eugenia Charles – 1980
 Foreign minister – Dame Eugenia Charles – 1980
 Defence minister – Dame Eugenia Charles – 1985
 Minister for Health and Social Security – Doreen Paul – 1995
 Minister for Community Development, Women's Affairs and Culture – Gertrude Roberts – 1995
 Minister of State in the Ministry of Tourism with responsibility for festivals/ Minister for Community Development, Gender Affairs, Information and Culture – Loreen Bannis-Roberts – 2005
 Minister for Education, Youth Affairs, Human Resource Development and Sports – Sonia Williams – 2008
 Minister for Culture, Youth Affairs and Sports – Justina Charles – 2010
 Minister for Social Services, Community Development and Gender Affairs – Gloria Shillingford – 2010

Dominican Republic

 Secretary of State for Education, Culture and Public Worship – Lilia Portalatín Sosa – 1964
 Secretary of State for Labour  – Altagracia Bautista de Suárez – 1966 
 Secretary of State for Industry and Trade  – Altagracia Bautista de Suárez – 1970 
 Subsecretary of State for External Relations  – Licelott Marte de Barrios – 1973

El Salvador

 Minister of Planning and Coordination of Economic and Social Development – Mirna Liévano de Márques Márquez – 1989
 Minister of Foreign Affairs – María Eugenia Brizuela de Ávila – 1999
 Vice President – Ana Vilma de Escobar – 2004
 Mayor of San Salvador – Violeta Menjívar – 2005
Minister of Health – María Isabel Rodríguez - 2009

Grenada

 Governor – Dame Hilda Bynoe – 1968
 Governor-General – Dame Cécile La Grenade – 2013
 President of the Senate – Margaret Neckles – 1990
 Speaker of the House of Representatives – Marcelle Peters – 1992
 Foreign minister – Clarice Modeste-Curwen – 2014

Guadeloupe

 National Assembly - Eugénie Éboué-Tell - 1945 (First black female member)

Guatemala

 Minister of Education – Maria Eugenia Tejada Jaureguide de Putzeys – 1980
 Minister of Foreign Affairs – Gladys Maritza Ruiz de Vielman – 1994
 Interior minister – Adela de Torrebiarte – 2007
 Vice President – Roxana Baldetti  – 2012

Haiti

 Secretary of State for Women Affairs – Rolande Chandler – 1986
 Minister of Information and Co-ordination – Rosemarie Nazan – 1989
 President (provisional) – Ertha Pascal-Trouillot – 1990 
 Foreign minister – Claudette Werleigh – 1993
 Prime Minister – Claudette Werleigh – 1995

Honduras

 Minister of Education – Alba Alonzo de Quesada – 1965
 Foreign Minister – Patricia Rodas – 2009
 Vice President – María Antonieta de Bográn – 2010
 President – Xiomara Castro – 2022

Jamaica

 Minister of Health and Labour – Rose Agatha Leon – 1953
 Prime Minister – Portia Simpson-Miller – 2006
Minister of Justice and Attorney General  - Dorothy Lightbourne - 2007-2011 
 Foreign minister – Kamina Johnson Smith – 2016

Martinique

 Member of Parliament - Josette Manin - 2017
Senator - Catherine Conconne - 2017

Mexico

National offices

 Member of the Chamber of Deputies – Elvia Carrillo Puerto – 1922 
 Subsecretary of Education for Culture – Amalia de Castillo Lédon – 1958
 Secretary of Tourism and first female Secretary of state – Rosa Luz Alegría – 1980
 Secretary of Foreign Affairs – Rosario Green – 1998
 Secretary of Social Development – Josefina Vázquez Mota – 2000
 Secretary of Education – Josefina Vázquez Mota – 2006
 Secretary of Energy – Georgina Kessel – 2006
 Secretariat of the Interior – Olga Sanchez Cordero – 2018
 Secretary of Economy – Graciela Márquez Colín – 2018
 Secretary of Labor – Luisa María Alcalde Luján – 2018

Local and municipal elected offices
Mayor – Norma Villarreal de Zambrano – Mayor (Alcalde) of San Pedro Garza García, 1967

State elected offices

Colima

 State governor – Griselda Álvarez, Colima – 1979

Tlaxcala

 Governor of Tlaxcala – Beatriz Paredes – 1987

Yucatán

 Governor of Yucatán – Dulce María Sauri Riancho – 1991
 (First elected) Governor of Yucatán – Ivonne Ortega – 2007

Zacatecas

 Governor of Zacatecas – Amalia García – 2004

Federal District/Mexico City

 Head of Government of the Federal District – Rosario Robles – 1999
 Elected Head of Government of the Federal District – Claudia Sheinbaum – 2018

Sonora
 Governor of Sonora – Claudia Pavlovich Arellano – 2015

Montserrat

 Minister of Education, Health and Welfare – Mary Rose Tuitt – 1970
 Governor – Deborah Barnes-Jones – 2004

Netherlands Antilles

 Minister of Health and Environment – Lucinda E. da Costa Gomez-Matheeuws – 1970
 Prime Minister – Maria Liberia Peters – 1984

Nicaragua

 Vice-Minister of Education  – Olga Nuñez Abaunza de Saballos – 1950
 Minister of Education – María Helena de Perras – 1974
 President – Violeta Chamorro – 1990
 Interior minister – Ana Isabel Morales Mazún – 2007

Panama

 Vice-Minister of Labor, Social Security and Public Health – Clara González de Berhinger – 1945
 Minister of Social Affairs and Health – Maria Santa Domingo de Miranda – 1950
 President – Mireya Moscoso – 1999
 Interior minister – Mariela Sagel – 1998
 Housing minister – Balbina Herrera – 2004
 Foreign minister – Isabel Saint Malo – 2014

Puerto Rico

 Assistant Attorney General – Miriam Maria Naveira de Rodón – 1966
 Secretary of Labour – Julia Rivera de Vincenti – 1968
 Governor – Sila María Calderón – 2000

Saint Kitts and Nevis
 Minister of Women's Affairs – Constance V. Mitcham – 1984
 Speaker of the National Assembly - Marcella Liburd - 2004
 Governor-General - Marcella Liburd - 2023

Saint Lucia

 Minister of Housing, Community Development, Local Government and Social Affairs, Groups Needs, Cooperatives, the Provident Fund and Water – Heraldine Rock – 1974
Minister of Legal Affairs - Lorraine Williams - 1992 
Governor-General – Dame Pearlette Louisy – 1997

Saint Vincent and the Grenadines

 Minister of Education Culture, Youth and Women's Affairs – Yvonne Francis-Gibson – 1989
 Attorney General - Judith Jones-Morgan - 2001 
Governor-General (acting) – Monica Dacon – 2002

Sint Maarten

Minister of Justice - Magali Jacoba - 2009 
Prime Minister – Sarah Wescot-Williams – 2010
 President of the Parliament – Gracita Arrindell – 2010
 Minister of Education, Culture, Youth, and Sports – Rhoda Arrindell – 2010
 Minister of Healthcare, Social Development, and Labor – Maria Buncamper-Molanus – 2010
 Minister Plenipotentiary – Josianne Fleming-Artsen – 2014
 Minister of Tourism, Economic Affairs, Transport and Telecommunications – Irania Arrindell – 2015

Trinidad and Tobago

 City Councillor – Port of Spain – Audrey Jeffers – 1936–1946
 Mayor – San Fernando – Beryl Archibald Crichlow – 1949
 Member of Parliament – Isabel Ursula Teshea – (People's National Movement) 1961–1970
 Minister of Government – Isabel Ursula Teshea (People's National Movement) – 1963–1970
 Speaker of the House of Representatives – Occah Seapaul – 1991–1995
 Mayor – Arima – Rose Janneire (People's National Movement) – 1992–1996
 Attorney General – Kamla Persad-Bissessar (United National Congress) – 1995–1996
 Acting Prime Minister – Kamla Persad-Bissessar  (United National Congress) – 2000
 President of the Senate – Linda Baboolal – 2002–2007
 Vice President of the Senate  – Christine Kangaloo (People's National Movement) - 2002
Acting President – Linda Baboolal – 2002–2007
 Ombudsman – Lynette Anthea Stephenson – 2006
 Leader of the Opposition – Kamla Persad-Bissessar  (United National Congress)  – 2006–2007, 2010, 2015–incumbent
 Deputy Speaker of the House of Representatives – Pennelope Beckles (People's National Movement) – 2007–2010
 Minister of Foreign Affairs – Paula Gopee-Scoon (People's National Movement) – 2007–2010
 Mayor – Chaguanas – Natasha Navas (United National Congress) – 2009–2010
 Prime Minister – Kamla Persad-Bissessar (United National Congress) – 2010 – 2015
 Opposition Chief Whip – Marlene McDonald (People's National Movement) – 2010 – 2015
 Leader of Opposition Business in the Senate – Pennelope Beckles (People's National Movement) – 2010 – 2013
President – Paula-Mae Weekes – 2018–Incumbent
Mayor – Point Fortin – Saleema McCree Thomas (People's National Movement) – 2020–Incumbent

Tobago 

 Member of Parliament – Pamela Nicholson (Democratic Action Congress) – 1981–2000
 Secretary for Health, Social Security and Environment (Democratic Action Congress) – Judy Michelle Bobb – 1996-2000
 Secretary for Community Development, Youth and Sport (Democratic Action Congress) – Miriam Caesar-More – 1996-2000
 Senator –  Cynthia Alfred (Tobago Council of the People's National Movement) –  1996–2001
 Deputy Chief Secretary of Tobago –  Cynthia Alfred (Tobago Council of the People's National Movement) – 2001–2009
 Secretary for Health and Social Services –  Cynthia Alfred (Tobago Council of the People's National Movement) – 2001–2009
 Presiding Officer of the Tobago House of Assembly –  Anne Mitchell-Gift (Tobago Council of the People's National Movement) – 2001–2013
 Secretary of Education, Youth Affairs and Sport –Anne Mitchell–Giift (Tobago Council of the People's National Movement) – 2006–2013
 Leader of Government Business in the Assembly  – Tracy Davidson-Celestine (Tobago Council of the People's National Movement) – 2009–2013 
 Secretary for Community Development and Culture – Tracy Davidson-Celestine (Tobago Council of the People's National Movement) – 2009–2013
 Acting Prime Minister – Vernella Alleyne-Toppin (Tobago Organisation of the People) – 2010
 Clerk of the Assembly – Vanessa Cutting-Thomas (Tobago Council of the People's National Movement)  – 2010–2013
 Secretary of Tourism and Transportation – Tracy Davidson-Celestine (Tobago Council of the People's National Movement) – 2013–2017
 Acting Chief Secretary of Tobago – Tracy Davidson-Celestine (Tobago Council of the People's National Movement) – 2016
 Secretary for Health, Wellness and Family Development – Agatha Carrington (Tobago Council of the People's National Movement) – 2017–2020
 Secretary for Community Development, Enterprise Development and Labour – Marslyn Melville-Jack (Tobago Council of the People's National Movement) – 2017–Incumbent
 Secretary for Tourism, Culture and Transportation – Nadine Stewart-Phillips (Tobago Council of the People's National Movement)– 2017–Incumbent
 Leader of a political party with representation in the House of Assembly  – Tracy Davidson-Celestine (Tobago Council of the People's National Movement) – 2020–Incumbent
Leader of a political party with representation in the House of Representatives  – Tracy Davidson-Celestine (Tobago Council of the People's National Movement) – 2020–Incumbent

Turks and Caicos Islands

 Minister of Natural Resources – Arabella Smith – 1991
 Governor (acting) – Cynthia Astwood – 2002
Premier of the Turks and Caicos Islands - Sharlene Cartwright-Robinson - 2016

United States

Governors of each State 
Alabama – Lurleen Wallace - 1967
Alaska – Sarah Palin - 2006
Arizona – Rose Mofford - 1988
Connecticut – Ella T. Grasso - 1975
Delaware – Ruth Ann Minner - 2001
Hawaii – Linda Lingle - 2002
Iowa – Kim Reynolds - 2017
Kansas – Joan Finney - 1991
Kentucky – Martha Collins - 1983
Louisiana – Kathleen Blanco - 2004
Maine – Janet Mills - 2019
Massachusetts – Jane Swift - 2001
Michigan – Jennifer Granholm - 2003
Montana – Judy Martz - 2001
Nebraska – Kay A. Orr - 1987
New Hampshire – Vesta M. Roy - 1982
New Jersey – Christine Todd Whitman - 1994
New Mexico – Susana Martinez - 2011
New York – Kathy Hochul - 2021
North Carolina – Bev Perdue - 2009
Ohio – Nancy Hollister - 1998
Oklahoma – Mary Fallin - 2011
Oregon – Barbara Roberts - 1991
Rhode Island – Gina Raimondo - 2015
South Carolina – Nikki Haley - 2011
South Dakota – Kristi Noem - 2019
Texas – Miriam A. Ferguson - 1925
Utah – Olene Walker - 2003
Vermont – Madeleine Kunin - 1985
Washington – Dixy Lee Ray - 1977
Wyoming – Nellie Tayloe Ross - 1925

Senators of each State 
Alabama – Dixie Graves - 1937
Alaska – Lisa Murkowski - 2002
Arizona – Martha McSally & Kyrsten Sinema - 2019
Arkansas – Hattie Caraway - 1931 (First female in history to be elected to the Senate)
California – Dianne Feinstein - 1992
Florida – Paula Hawkins - 1981
Georgia – Rebecca Felton - 1922 (First female in the history to be appointed to the Senate)
Hawaii – Mazie Hirono - 2013
Illinois – Carol Moseley-Braun - 1993
Iowa – Joni Ernst - 2015
Kansas – Nancy Kassebaum - 1978
Louisiana – Rose Long - 1936
Maine – Margaret C. Smith - 1949
Maryland – Barbara Mikulski - 1987
Massachusetts  - Elizabeth Warren - 2013
Michigan – Debbie Stabenow - 2001
Minnesota – Muriel Humphrey - 1978
Mississippi - Cindy Hyde-Smith - 2018
Missouri – Jean Carnahan - 2001
Nebraska – Eva Bowring - 1954
Nevada – Catherine Cortez Masto - 2017
New Hampshire – Jeanne Shaheen - 2009
New York – Hillary Clinton - 2001
North Carolina – Elizabeth Dole - 2003
North Dakota – Jocelyn Burdick - 1992
Oregon – Maurine Neuberger - 1960
South Dakota – Gladys Pyle - 1938 (First female in history to be elected in her own right to the Senate rather than achieving office through Widow's Succession)
Tennessee – Marsha Blackburn - 2019
Texas – Kay Hutchison - 1993
Washington – Patty Murray - 1993 
West Virginia – Shelley Moore Capito - 2015
Wisconsin – Tammy Baldwin - 2013
Wyoming – Cynthia Lummis - 2021

Representatives of each State 
Alabama – Elizabeth B. Andrews - 1972
Alaska – Mary Peltola - 2022
Arizona – Isabella Greenway - 1933
Arkansas – Pearl Peden Oldfield - 1929
California – Mae Nolan - 1923
Colorado – Pat Schroeder - 1973
Connecticut – Clare Boothe Luce - 1943
Delaware – Lisa Blunt Rochester - 2017
Florida – Ruth Bryan Owen - 1929
Georgia – Florence Reville Gibbs - 1940
Hawaii – Patsy Mink - 1964
Idaho – Gracie Pfost - 1953
Illinois – Winnifred Sprague Mason Huck - 1922
Indiana  – Virginia E. Jenckes - 1933
Iowa – Cindy Axne & Abby Finkenauer - 2019
Kansas – Kathryn O'Loughlin McCarthy - 1933
Kentucky – Katherine G. Langley - 1927
Louisiana – Lindy Boggs - 1935
Maine – Margaret Chase Smith - 1940
Maryland – Katharine Byron - 1941
Massachusetts – Edith Nourse Rogers - 1925
Michigan – Ruth Thompson - 1951
Minnesota – Coya Knutson - 1955
Missouri – Leonor Sullivan - 1953
Montana – Jeannette Rankin - 1917 (First female in history to be elected to Congress & the House of Representatives)
Nebraska – Virginia D. Smith - 1975
Nevada – Barbara Vucanovich - 1983
New Hampshire – Carol Shea-Porter - 2007
New Jersey – Mary Teresa Norton - 1925
New Mexico – Georgia Lee Lusk - 1947
New York – Ruth Baker Pratt - 1929
North Carolina – Eliza Jane Pratt - 1946
Ohio – Frances P. Bolton - 1940
Oklahoma – Alice Mary Robertson - 1921
Oregon – Nan Wood Honeyman - 1937
Pennsylvania – Veronica Grace Boland - 1942
Rhode Island – Claudine Schneider - 1981
South Carolina – Elizabeth Hawley Gasque - 1938
South Dakota – Stephanie Herseth Sandlin - 2004
Tennessee – Willa McCord Blake Eslick - 1932
Texas – Lera Millard Thomas - 1966
Utah – Reva Beck Bosone - 1949
Virginia – Leslie Byrne - 1993
Washington – Catherine Dean May - 1959
West Virginia – Elizabeth Kee - 1951
Wisconsin – Tammy Baldwin - 1999
Wyoming – Barbara Cubin - 1995

Non-voting members of each Territory or District of Columbia 
American Samoa – Amata Coleman Radewagen - 2015
District of Columbia – Eleanor Holmes Norton - 1991
Guam – Madeleine Bordallo - 2003
Hawaii Territory – Mary Elizabeth Pruett Farrington - 1954
Puerto Rico – Jenniffer González - 2017
United States Virgin Islands – Donna Christian-Christensen - 1997

Congressional Firsts 
First woman to be elected to the United States House of Representatives - Jeannette Rankin - 1916
First woman to run for a Senate seat - Jeannette Rankin - 1918
First female to preside over the House – Alice Mary Robertson of Oklahoma - 1921
First woman to be appointed to the United States Senate - Rebecca Latimer Felton  - 1922
First woman to be elected to the United States Senate - Hattie Caraway - 1932
First female to preside over the Senate – Hattie Caraway of Arkansas - 1943
First female to serve in both houses of Congress – Margaret Chase Smith of Maine - 1948
First female pages appointed in Senate – Paulette Desell, Ellen McConnell, and Julie Price - 1971

Local and municipal elected offices 

Superintendent of Public Education  - Ellen Webster - 1872 Harvey County, Kansas.
Superintendent of Public Education  - Mary Higby - 1872 Labette County, Kansas.
Board of Education - Lydia Sayer Hasbrouck - 1880
Mayor - Susanna M. Salter - 1887
Chief of the Cherokee Nation - Wilma Mankiller - 1985
Chairwoman of the Tohono O'odham Nation - Vivian Juan-Saunders - 2003

State elected offices 

State House of Representatives - Carrie C. Holly, Clara Cressingham, and Frances S. Klock all of Colorado - 1894
State Senator - Martha Hughes Cannon of Utah - 1896
First female to serve in both houses of State legislature - Edna Beard of Vermont - 1923
Governor - Nellie Tayloe Ross of Wyoming - 1925
Speaker of a State House of Representatives - Minnie Davenport Craig of North Dakota -1933
Lieutenant governor - Consuelo Northrop Bailey of Vermont - 1955
State Senate Majority Leader - Sandra Day O'Connor of Arizona - 1972

National offices

Elected 

United States House of Representatives - Jeannette Rankin - 1917
United States Senate - Hattie Wyatt Caraway - 1932
Speaker of the United States House of Representatives - Nancy Pelosi - 2007
Vice President of the United States - Kamala Harris - 2021

National caucus or political party 

Secretary of the Democratic House Caucus - Chase G. Woodhouse - 1949
Chairwoman of the Republican Senate Conference - Margaret Chase Smith - 1967
Chairperson of the Democratic Party National Committee - Jean Westwood - 1972
Chairperson of the Republican Party National Committee - Mary Louise Smith - 1974
House Democratic Whip - Nancy Pelosi - 2002
House Democratic Leader - Nancy Pelosi - 2003
Senate Chief Deputy Democratic Whip - Barbara Boxer - 2007

Heads of the each Federal Executive Department 

Secretary of State - Madeleine Albright - 1997
Secretary of the Treasury - Janet Yellen - 2021
Attorney General - Janet Reno - 1993
Secretary of the Interior - Gale Norton - 2001
Secretary of Agriculture - Ann Veneman - 2001
Secretary of Commerce - Juanita M. Kreps - 1977
Secretary of Labor - Frances Perkins - 1933 (First female in history to be appointed to the Cabinet)
Secretary of Health and Human Services - Oveta Culp Hobby - 1953 (The position was established as Secretary of Health, Education, and Welfare on April 11, 1953; Renamed on May 4, 1980)
Secretary of Housing and Urban Development - Carla Anderson Hills - 1975
Secretary of Transportation - Elizabeth Dole - 1983
Secretary of Energy - Hazel R. O'Leary - 1993
Secretary of Education - Shirley Hufstedler - 1979
Secretary of Homeland Security - Janet Napolitano - 2009

Heads of former Federal Executive Departments 

Postmaster General - Megan Brennan - 2015 (Reorganized department)
Secretary of the Air Force - Sheila Widnall - 1993 (Merged department)
Secretary of the Navy - Susan Livingstone (acting) - 2003 (Merged department)
Secretary of the Army - Christine Wormuth - 2021 (Merged department)

Executive Office of the President advisors 

 Office of the United States Trade Representative - Carla Anderson Hills - 1989
 Chair of the Council of Economic Advisers - Laura Tyson - 1993
 Director of the Office of Management and Budget - Alice Rivlin - 1994
 Director of the National Economic Council - Laura Tyson - 1995
 National Security Advisor - Condoleezza Rice - 2001
 Homeland Security Advisor - Frances Townsend - 2004

See also
List of elected and appointed female heads of state and government
List of the first LGBT holders of political offices
List of the first women holders of political offices in South America

References

North America
North America-related lists
Central America-related lists
Caribbean-related lists
Women in North America
Women in Central America
Women in the Caribbean